Khammam (urban) mandal is one of the 46 mandals in Khammam district of the Indian state of Telangana. It is under the administration of Khammam revenue division and has its headquarters at Khammam. The mandal is bounded by Kamepalli, Enkuru, Konijerla, Khammam (rural) and Chintakani mandals.

Government and politics 

Khammam urban mandal is the only mandal under Khammam assembly constituency, which in turn represents Khammam lok sabha constituency of Telangana Legislative Assembly.

Towns and villages 

 census, the mandal has 13 settlements. It includes 1 town and 12 villages.

The settlements in the mandal are listed below:

Note: M-Municipality, CT–Census town

See also 
 List of mandals in Telangana

References 

Mandals in Khammam district